The Rad Sladkovsky lodge, also known as Pishelville Hall, is a building located near Verdigre, Nebraska that was built in 1884. It was listed on the National Register of Historic Places on June 29, 1982.  The building historically served as a meeting hall for the Czech community, hosting a Zapadni Ceska Bratrska Jednota (ZCBJ) lodge that was the oldest Czech fraternal order in Nebraska.  The lodge was originally organized as a branch of the Czech-Slovak Protective Society, but was incorporated into the ZCBJ in 1897.

References

External links
 

Western Fraternal Life Association
Czech-Slovak Protective Society
Czech-American culture in Nebraska
Buildings and structures in Knox County, Nebraska
Clubhouses on the National Register of Historic Places in Nebraska
Cultural infrastructure completed in 1884
National Register of Historic Places in Knox County, Nebraska